Vija is a feminine Latvian feminine given name. Individuals bearing the name Vija include:

Vija Artmane (1929–2008), Latvian actress
Vija Celmins (born 1938), Latvian-American visual artist
Vija Vētra (born 1923), Latvian dancer and choreographer

References 

Latvian feminine given names